B. erectum may refer to:

 Brachyelytrum erectum, a grass species in the genus Brachyelytrum
 Bulbophyllum erectum, an orchid species

See also
 Erectum (disambiguation)